Michael Silverblatt (born August 6, 1952) is a literary critic and American broadcaster who hosted Bookworm, a nationally syndicated radio program focusing on books and literature, from 1989 to 2022.

Bookworm is broadcast by Los Angeles public radio station KCRW.

Early life
A lifelong voracious reader, Silverblatt was born in Queens, New York, into a Jewish family, attended SUNY Buffalo, majored in English, then entered postgraduate studies at Johns Hopkins University but dropped out.

Later, he moved to Los Angeles with the intention of becoming a screenwriter. But after impressing KCRW's general manager during a discussion of Russian poetry at a dinner party, he was offered his own radio show.

KCRW Bookworm
On Bookworm, Silverblatt has interviewed a variety of writers, including such contemporary authors as W. G. Sebald, T. C. Boyle, David Foster Wallace, William Gass, Zadie Smith, Lorrie Moore, Joy Williams, Tao Lin, Joshua Cohen, Maggie Nelson, Dave Eggers, Ann Beattie, Karl Ove Knausgaard, and Richard Powers. He calls his interviews "conversations" and does not use prompts or question sheets. Critics and interviewees have noted Silverblatt's well-preparedness; if possible, he reads his interviewee's work in advance.

Underwritten by the Lannan Foundation, Bookworm is distributed free of charge to around 50 U.S. radio stations. Silverblatt worked on the show unpaid for its first five years.

Literary critic
Silverblatt coined the term transgressive fiction.

Silverblatt's Los Angeles Times review of William Gass's The Tunnel was blurbed on the cover of its paperback release: "The most beautiful, most complex, most disturbing novel to be published in my lifetime."

References

External links 
 KCRW Bookworm webpage and audio archive

1952 births
Living people
American radio personalities
People from Queens, New York
University at Buffalo alumni
20th-century American Jews
NPR personalities
21st-century American Jews
American literary critics